Chlorella lewinii is a euryhaline, unicellular microalga in the Division Chlorophyta. It is spherical to oval-shaped, is solitary and lacks a mucilaginous envelope.

References

Further reading

Bashan, Yoav, et al. "Chlorella sorokiniana (formerly C. vulgaris) UTEX 2714, a non-thermotolerant microalga useful for biotechnological applications and as a reference strain." Journal of Applied Phycology (2015): 1–9.
Pongpadung, Piyawat, et al. "Screening for hydrogen-producing strains of green microalgae in phosphorus or sulphur deprived medium under nitrogen limitation." ScienceAsia 41.2 (2015): 97–107.

External links

lewinii